Peter Clack is an Australian drummer – for ten months he was an early member of hard rock band AC/DC. In April 1974 he joined Malcolm Young (rhythm guitar), Angus Young (lead guitar), Dave Evans (lead vocals) and Rob Bailey (bass guitar). He appears in early video footage of AC/DC, the Last Picture Show Theatre video of "Can I Sit Next to You Girl". Clack was a member of the band during the recording of their debut album High Voltage but most of the drum parts were recorded by session man Tony Currenti. Clack continued with AC/DC until January 1975 when he was sacked along with Bailey, Clack's permanent replacement was Phil Rudd.

Prior to joining AC/DC, Clack had played with Bailey in Flake. Peter was the drummer of the Allan Hessey Big Band. As of November 2011 he played with Melbourne-based band Raw Sylke. He is now a drum teacher.

References

 Two Sides to Every Glory, Paul Stenning, 2005
 "Metal Hammer & Classic Rock present AC/DC", Metal Hammer magazine special, 2005

AC/DC members
Year of birth missing (living people)
Living people
Australian rock drummers
Male drummers